Delia Micucci Valeri (October 4, 1870 – January 27, 1947) was an American vocal coach, born in Italy.

Early life 
Delia Micucci was born in Italy, and graduated from the National Academy of Santa Cecilia in Rome. She moved to the United States before 1901.

Career 
Valeri taught voice students and opera professionals in New York and Chicago, including Regina Vicarino, Maude Fay, Melanie Kurt, Margaret Matzenauer, Clara Clemens, and Frieda Hempel. She worked with African-American soprano Florence Cole Talbert in Italy in the 1920s. Her male clients included Clarence Whitehill. She also provided piano accompaniment at recitals.

In 1942 Valeri opened a studio in Hollywood.

Personal life 
Delia Micucci married August Valeri in New York City about 1901. They had daughters Adelaide and Rosa. In 1914, Delia Valeri won a $2000 judgment after a chronic stomach ailment she traced to a meal on a pullman car. In 1915, August and Delia Valeri were passengers in a car with Margaret Matzenauer and her husband Edoardo Ferrari-Fontana when it was involved in a collision in New York. Valeri died in 1947, aged 76, in Los Angeles, California.

References 

1870 births
1947 deaths
Vocal coaches
Italian singers